The Schempp-Hirth Nimbus 3 is a glider built by Schempp-Hirth.

Design and development
The Nimbus-3 uses carbon-fibre extensively and has a new wing profile compared with the Nimbus-2. It has a four-piece carbon-fibre wing with a 22.9 metre span but may be increased to 24.5 or 25.5 metres with tip extensions. The outer wing panels are slightly modified Ventus wings. When rolling at large aileron deflection, small spoiler flaps deploy at the inner wingtip to compensate for lack of rudder power. It was first flown on 21 February 1981 by its designer Dipl.-Ing Klaus Holighaus. A glide ratio of 60:1 has been claimed. The Nimbus-3T version has a sustainer engine.

Nimbus-3s took the first three places in the Open Class in the 1981 World Gliding Championships although there were only 12 entrants. In the 1983 World Championships it took the top six places, and it won again in the 1985 Championships.

The D-model (Nimbus-3D) is the two-seater version. There is also a self-launched two-seat version (Nimbus-3DM) and a two-seat sustainer version (Nimbus-3DT). The first flight of the D-model was in May 1986.

The Nimbus-3 was succeeded by the Schempp-Hirth Nimbus-4.

Specifications (Nimbus 3)

See also

References

Further reading

External links

Johnson R, A Flight Test Evaluation of the Nimbus-3, Soaring, December 1982
Sailplane Directory
Schempp-Hirth homepage

Nimbus-3
1980s German sailplanes
Motor gliders
T-tail aircraft
Aircraft first flown in 1981